KDHN (1470 AM, "The Twister") is a radio station broadcasting a country music format. Licensed to Dimmitt, Texas, United States, the station serves the Amarillo area. The station is currently owned by Nancy Whalen, through licensee ELB Broadcasting.

References

External links

DHN
Country radio stations in the United States
Radio stations established in 1987